Khorramshahr County is in Khuzestan province, Iran. The capital of the county is the city of Khorramshahr. At the 2006 census, the county's population was 155,224 in 32,563 households. The following census in 2011 counted 163,701 people in 42,171 households. At the 2016 census, the county's population was 170,976 in 47,380 households.

Administrative divisions

The population history of Khorramshahr County's administrative divisions over three consecutive censuses is shown in the following table. The latest census shows two districts, four rural districts, and two cities.

References

 

Counties of Khuzestan Province